A historical geographic information system (also written as historical GIS or HGIS) is a geographic information system that may display, store and analyze data of past geographies and track changes in time. It can be regarded as a tool for historical geography.

Techniques used in HGIS
 Digitization and georeferencing of historical maps: Old maps may contain valuable information about the past. By adding coordinates to such maps, they may be added as a feature layer to modern GIS data: This facilitates comparison of different map layers showing the geography at different times. The maps may be further enhanced by techniques such as rubbersheeting, which spatially warps the data to fit with more accurate modern maps.
 Reconstruction of past boundaries: By creating polygons of former political entities, administrative sub-divisions and other types of borders, their evolution as well as aggregated statistics can be compared through time.
 Georeferencing of historical microdata (such as census or parish records): This enables the use of spatial analysis to historical data.

Notable historical GIS projects
 China Historical GIS is a project on Imperial China developed by Harvard University and Fudan University.
 David Rumsey Historical Map Collection is one of the world's largest map collections, which has digitized and georeferenced a large part of its collection and published it on the internet.
 Electronic Cultural Atlas Initiative (ECAI) is a clearinghouse for the exchange of metadata of Historical GIS. Maintained by the University of California, Berkeley.
 Euratlas History Maps is a historical atlas of Europe from year 1 to present days with one map per century. The maps depict sovereign states as well as administrative divisions and dependent territories.
 Great Britain Historical GIS is a GIS-enabled database holding diverse geo-referenced maps, statistics, gazetteers and travel writing, especially for the period 1801–2001 covered by British censuses. Created and maintained by Portsmouth University.
 HistoAtlas is an open historical geographical information system that tries to build a free historical atlas of the world.
 National Historical Geographic Information System (NHGIS) is a system for displaying and analyzing Census tracts and tract changes in the United States.

Software or web services developed for Historical GIS
 Google Earth added a time line feature in version 4 (2006) that enables simple temporal browsing of spatial data.
 TimeMap is a Java open-source applet (or program) for browsing spatial-temporal data and ECAI data sets. Developed by the department of archaeology University of Sydney.

See also
 Digital history
 
 GIS in archaeology
 Landscape history
 Rephotography
 Spatiotemporal database
 Time geography

References

Further reading
 Ian N. Gregory, Don Debats, Don Lafreniere eds.: The Routledge Companion to Spatial History. Routledge 2018 
 Joachim Laczny: Friedrich III. (1440–1493) auf Reisen. Die Erstellung des Itinerars eines spätmittelalterlichen Herrschers unter Anwendung eines Historical Geographic Information System (Historical GIS) In: Joachim Laczny, Jürgen Sarnowsky eds.: Perzeption und Rezeption. Wahrnehmung und Deutung im Mittelalter und in der Moderne (Nova Mediaevalia Quellen und Studien zum europäischen Mittelalter, 12), Göttingen: V&R unipress 2014, p. 33–65. , 
 Ian N. Gregory, Paul Ell: Historical GIS: Technologies, Methodologies, and Scholarship (Cambridge Studies in Historical Geography) 2008 
 Anne Kelly Knowles: Past Time, Past Place: GIS for history A collection of twelve case studies on the use of GIS in historical research and education. ESRI press 2002  
 Anne Kelly Knowles, Amy Hillier eds.: Placing History: How Maps, Spatial Data, and GIS Are Changing Historical Scholarship 2008   
 Ian N. Gregory: A place in History A short introduction to HGIS by the lead developers of GBHGIS ISSN 1463-5194
 Ott, T. and Swiaczny, F.: Time-integrative GIS. Management and analysis of spatio-temporal data, Berlin / Heidelberg / New York: Springer 2001  
 Feature edition of Historical development GIS in the journal Social Science History 24 2000, Introduction by Anne Kelly Knowles.

 
Applications of geographic information systems